Psilopeganum is a genus of flowering plants of the family Rutaceae.

Characteristics
It is a monotypic genus, with only a single species: Psilopeganum sinense (not to be confused with Ephedra/ma huang).

Distribution
It is native to the Three Gorges Reservoir area, in the Hubei province of central China, where it has become endangered.  A specimen exists at the New York Botanical Garden.

Medicinal uses
Psilopeganum sinense is one of the 50 fundamental herbs used in traditional Chinese medicine.

See also
Chinese herbology 50 fundamental herbs

References

External links
Photo from New York Botanical Garden collection

Rutoideae
Monotypic Rutaceae genera
Plants used in traditional Chinese medicine